Benjamin Peter Francis Nolan-Stone (born 13 May 1983 in Poole, Dorset) is a former English cricketer. Nolan was a right-handed batsman who bowled right-arm fast-medium.

Nolan made a single List-A appearance for the Hampshire Cricket Board in the 1st Round of the 2001 Cheltenham and Gloucester Trophy against the Kent Cricket Board. Nolan was not required to bat or bowl as Kent Cricket Board won on a bowl out.

Nolan made a single appearance in the 2005 Second Eleven Championship for Hampshire Second XI against Warwickshire Second XI.

External links
Ben Nolan at Cricinfo
Ben Nolan at CricketArchive

1983 births
Living people
Cricketers from Poole
Cricketers from Dorset
English cricketers
Hampshire Cricket Board cricketers